Harald Didrik Alfsen (October 6, 1873 – August 24, 1949) was a Norwegian engineer and writer.

Alfsen graduated from the Kristiania Technical School in 1894. In the following years he was employed at the Kristiania Reinforced Concrete and Concrete Products Factory, and he was then a city engineer in Porsgrunn. He participated in the development of the Grenland municipal power company. He was in charge of programming for the radio station in Porsgrunn in 1927. For the University of Oslo, he served as the technical head for the excavation of Rakni's Mound. Alfsen was a teacher at the Oslo Technical School for a time, and he published several textbooks. He also wrote novels, plays, and children's books. In 1899 he made his debut with the science fiction novel Jernmennesket (The Iron Man), published under the pseudonym Finn Fare.

Bibliography
 Jernmennesket (The Iron Man), 1899
 Betonskibsbygning (Concrete Ship Construction), 1917 
 Veslefrikk med fela (Little Freddy and His Fiddle), 1923
 Småfortellinger (Short Stories) 1926 
 Porsgrunns kommunale elektrisitetsverk 1901–1931 (The Porsgrunn Municipal Power Station, 1901–1931), 1931 
 Oppgaver i praktisk regning (Exercises in Applied Mathematics) 1945 
 Teknisk skrift (Technical Writing), 1945, reprints: 1963, 1972, 1977, 1979

References

1873 births
1949 deaths
Norwegian engineers
Norwegian science fiction writers